1213 Algeria, provisional designation , is a carbonaceous asteroid from the outer region of the asteroid belt, approximately 32 kilometers in diameter. Discovered by Guy Reiss at Algiers Observatory in 1931, it was named after the North African country of Algeria.

Discovery 

Algeria was discovered by French astronomer Guy Reiss at the North African Algiers Observatory on 5 December 1931. Three nights later, the body was independently discovered by Belgian–American astronomer George Van Biesbroeck at the U.S. Yerkes Observatory in Wisconsin.

A first precovery was taken at Yerkes Observatory, extending the Algerias observation arc by just 16 days prior to its official discovery observation.

Orbit and classification 

The dark asteroid orbits the Sun in the outer main-belt at a distance of 2.7–3.5 AU once every 5 years and 7 months (2,035 days). Its orbit has an eccentricity of 0.13 and an inclination of 13° with respect to the ecliptic.

Physical characteristics

Lightcurve 

A rotational lightcurve of Algeria was obtained from photometric observations made by French amateur astronomer Claudine Rinner in August 2002. Lightcurve analysis gave a rotation period of 16 hours with a brightness variation of 0.19 magnitude.

Diameter and albedo 

According to the space-based surveys carried out by the Infrared Astronomical Satellite IRAS, the Japanese Akari satellite, and NASA's Wide-field Infrared Survey Explorer with its subsequent NEOWISE mission, Algeria measures between 29.2 and 34.5 kilometers in diameter and its surface has an albedo in the range of 0.057 to 0.093.

The Collaborative Asteroid Lightcurve Link derives an albedo of 0.059 and a diameter of 33.1 kilometers with an absolute magnitude of 11.1, and characterizes it as a C-type asteroid.

Naming 

This minor planet was named in honour of the North African country Algeria, location of the discovering observatory and a French colony at the time. The official  was mentioned in The Names of the Minor Planets by Paul Herget in 1955.

References

External links 
 Asteroid Lightcurve Database (LCDB), query form (info )
 Dictionary of Minor Planet Names, Google books
 Asteroids and comets rotation curves, CdR – Observatoire de Genève, Raoul Behrend
 Discovery Circumstances: Numbered Minor Planets (1)-(5000) – Minor Planet Center
 
 

001213
Discoveries by Guy Reiss
Named minor planets
19311205